The Shadow Ministry of Malcolm Fraser was the opposition Coalition shadow ministry of Australia from 26 March to 11 November 1975, opposing Gough Whitlam's Labor Whitlam ministry.

The shadow ministry is a group of senior opposition spokespeople who form an alternative ministry to the government's, whose members shadow or mark each individual Minister or portfolio of the Government.

Malcolm Fraser became Leader of the Opposition upon his election as leader of the Liberal Party of Australia on 21 March 1975 and appointed a new Shadow Ministry.

Shadow Ministry
The following were members of the Shadow Ministry:

Shadow Cabinet

Outer shadow ministry

See also
 Shadow Ministry of Billy Snedden
 First Fraser Ministry
 Third Whitlam ministry

References

Liberal Party of Australia
National Party of Australia
Fraser
Opposition of Australia
1983 establishments in Australia
1985 disestablishments in Australia